Louis Bertrand may refer to:

 Louis Bertrand (saint) (1526–1581), Spanish Dominican priest
 Louis Bertrand (Quebec seigneur) (1779–1871), Canadian politician and businessman
 Aloysius Bertrand (1807–1841), French poet
 Louis Bertrand (novelist) (1866–1941), French novelist, historian, and essayist
 Louis Bertrand (politician) (1856–1943), Belgian politician, author, and Minister of State

See also
 Louis Bertrand Castel (1688–1757), French mathematician 
 Louis A. Bertrand (1808–1875), early French Mormon leader, translator of first French Book of Mormon
 Louis Bertrand Goodall (1851–1935), American politician